Tactical Unit: Comrades in Arms is a 2009 Hong Kong film directed by Law Wing-Cheong. This film is also called "PTU 2", in reference to the first film in the series, PTU, though it is not the second entry in the Tactical Unit series.

"Comrades in Arms" has been featured in the 2009 Hong Kong Film Panorama in Brussels, the 2009 New York Asian Film Festival of New York City, the 2009 Zero em Comportamento festival of Lisbon, and the 2009 Fantasia Festival of Montreal.

Plot
As a front-line police officer, you never leave a brother behind or bite a brother's behind... Tactical Unit Column Sergeant Sam (Simon Yam) and May (Maggie Siu) have been working together for some time but have never got along well. May is promoted recently as she always wins praises from her supervisor, whereas Sam is shut out from any chance of promotion. As a result, their column's morale drops to all-time low. A daring bank heist takes the tactical unit to Hong Kong's remote mountains searching for armed bandits. As Sam and May lead their team to conduct sweeps amidst treacherous terrain and deadly ambushes, they understand the only way to survive the mission is if they stick together as one.

Cast
 Simon Yam - Sam
 Maggie Shiu - May
 Lam Suet - Fat Lo
 Samuel Pang - Roy
 Vincent Sze - Cow
 Ben Wong - Officer Ho
 Teddy Lin
 Tommy Yuen
 Lam King Kong
 Lam Diy Kuen
 Wong Chi Wai
 Cheung Wing Cheung
 Hon Chun
 Lee Gin Hing
 Luk Man Wai
 Ma Chao
 Wong Gwan Hong
 Jack Wong Wai Leung
 Wong Wa Wo

Production
Several scenes of the film were shot at St. Joseph's Church in Ma On Shan Village.

Release
Comrades in Arms was released in theaters on 8 January 2009. The film was released on DVD and VCD on 17 April 2009.

Awards and nominations
16th Hong Kong Film Critics Society Award
 Film of Merit

See also
 Tactical Unit (film series)

References

External links

Tactical Unit - Comrades in Arms at the Hong Kong Movie Database
Tactical Unit - Comrades in Arms at the Hong Kong Cinemagic

Films directed by Law Wing-cheung
Hong Kong action films
2000s Cantonese-language films
2009 films
2000s action drama films
2000s crime drama films
Milkyway Image films
2009 drama films